Yon Tumarkin (born 22 July 1989) is an Israeli actor and singer, best known for playing Leo in the TV series Split.

Early life 
Tumarkin was born and raised in Jaffa, Israel, to a family of Jewish descent. He is the youngest son of Naama Tumarkin and artist Yigal Tumarkin.  His paternal grandfather was German actor Martin Hellberg, whose father was a pastor. When he was 13, his parents were divorced and he and his mother moved to Tel Aviv. There he went to the high school Tichon Ironi Alef and got the diploma of Art. On August 18, 2008, he took a break from the army for his television work. In 2011, Yon Tumarkin finished his work at the army.

Career 
By the age of eight, Tumarkin was discovered by casting director Yael Aviv when sitting in a cafe with his father. The next day, Tumarkin went to his first audition. During his childhood, Tumarkin appeared in many different TV commercials. He got his first bigger acting job at the age of ten in the TV film Who stole the show? (Hebrew: מי גנב את ההצגה). At the age of twelve, he appeared in the film Shisha Million Rasism. He played a mute child and Holocaust survivor. From there, his career took off with a leading role in a TV series called Ha-Yeladim Mi'Givat Napoleon (Napoleon Hills Kids). In 2009, Tumarkin sang "Power of Thought" at the Festigal and won the second place for his performance of the song.
In the same, year he co-starred with Amit Farkash in the TV series Split playing Leo Zachs, a 600-year-old Vampire who looks like a teenager. The series was a huge success in Israel and was sold to 78 different countries. From 2009 until 2012, Tumarkin was awarded four times in a row with Israeli Television Academy Award as the best actor.

In 2012, he played a main role in the award-winning Israeli drama film Rock the Casbah. In 2014, Yon Tumarkin got a main role in the TV series The Nerd Club.

In 2015, Tumarkin starred along Yael Grobglas and Danielle Jadelyn in JeruZalem, an English-speaking Israeli horror film.

In 2016, Tumarkin appeared in the Israeli child series Susey Pere (Wild Horses) as Libby Yahav. In the same year it was announced that Tumarkin was cast in the TV series "המלאך השומר שלי" (My Guardian Angel). The series deals with a group of adolescents who all have their own guardian angel.

In 2018, he played the graphic designer Reuben in an episode of the British crime series McMafia.

Personal life 
During the filming of Split, Tumarkin met Amit Farkash, and the two of them began dating. After their break up, Tumarkin dated the model Alexa Tamari. However, their relationship ended in August 2014. Tumarkin lives in Ramat Gan.

Filmography

Film

Television

External links 

Official Facebook account
Yon Tumarkin at Ishim (Israeli film data base)

References 

Israeli Jews
1989 births
Living people
Israeli male film actors
Israeli male television actors
21st-century Israeli male actors
People from Jaffa
Male actors from Tel Aviv
Israeli male child actors